= Corporate pathos =

Concept in public relations

Corporate pathos is public relations jargon for the employment of emotional engagement techniques to help alter adverse public attitudes to a corporation.

In general, pathos refers to the use of an emotional appeal. The term "corporate pathos" describes the use of emotional arguments alongside rational explanations for organizations to convince audiences of their given position.

== Background ==
Pathos originates from Greek rhetoric, coupled with logos and ethos, as a primary role of persuasion which focuses on emotion. The Greek word translates to “experience, misfortune, emotion, condition” coming from the stem “path” of the same definition.

Pathos is typically defined as the power of a person, object, writing, or situation to cause a certain feeling or emotion. In some cases to elicit emotion only, or elicit emotion for a certain purpose. Pathos relies on the neglect of rational thinking to allow the emotional side of influence to overcome.

Corporate, coming from the term corporation, refers to that of a business, large company, or group united as a single legal entity. This involves an individual or members authorized to represent a legal entity to the public to face scrutiny, demand, and reaction. Corporate groups or entities are in charge of issues within and outside of the company, facing public and interpersonal executive reactions and standards.

The combined term “corporate pathos” refers to this appeal of emotion, within a corporate setting. The corporate pathos technique is used by businesses facing a crisis and or an angry public. This emotional appeal is a cornerstone of handling modern business.

== Role ==
The process of appealing to the audience from a corporate level to a corporate, comes with Aristotle’s three rhetoric pillars of Ethos, Logos, and Pathos. Ethos relies on the credibility and trustworthiness of the speaker, Logos refers to the clarity and integrity of the speaker, while Pathos refers to the emotion which in turn clouds the judgment of the other two. The goal in this case is to persuade each level of the company, to a certain action or judgment.

== Application ==
=== Corporate setting ===
Within the board rooms and the executive point of view, at a certain level corporate entities might use an emotional appeal to get their way in the board room. Management will use corporate reports as a communicative channel, presenting the results in a way that might sway the executives.

=== Consumer setting ===
An advertiser, that aims to get their message across to an audience that will retain their branding and product if the advertisement contains an emotional appeal. Companies incorporate emotions into public facing aspects. This builds connections with consumers, who then recognize brands and establish emotional loyalty to the company.

== Impact ==
Because of the integration of emotional appeal in a corporate and consumer setting, the emphases on emotional appeal is more prevalent. Models of communication focus around the advancements of the companies and profit, using many elements of Logos, Ethos, and especially Pathos to drive the public as well as the corporate entities. It is understood that research in the vast majority of disciplines have established the necessity of paying attention to how emotional appeals can impact corporate messaging.

== Examples ==
Corporate messaging might appeal to emotions through storytelling or nostalgia. Any strategy that involves the models of persuasion of feeling and not rationality.

== Criticisms and ethical concerns ==
Many scholars and those in the corporate field are suspicious of the use of emotional appeal within a corporate setting. Emotions are seen as a distraction from logical reasoning and the assessment of all arguments, which negates the belief that any argument that is rational enough is able to cut through emotions.

Because philosophers such as Descartes argue that emotional parts of people are not within a rational mind, where emotions dominate over rationality and reason, it is controversial for these tactics to be present on a corporate level.
